Jamie Murray and Bruno Soares were the defending champions, but lost in the final to Wesley Koolhof and Matwé Middelkoop, 3–6, 5–7.

Seeds

Draw

Draw

References
 Main Draw

M